Bernard Philip "Barney" Traynor (November 24, 1894 – August 26, 1980) was a player in the National Football League for the Milwaukee Badgers in 1925 as a center. He played at the collegiate level at Colgate University.

Biography
Traynor was born on November 24, 1896 in Beaver Dam, Wisconsin.  While football line coach and freshman basketball coach at Michigan State College from 1925–27, Traynor wrote a lyric to music by  Gaetano Donizetti, the Sextet from his opera, Lucia di Lammermoor, which is now the Michigan State University alma mater, MSU Shadows.

References

Milwaukee Badgers players
Michigan State Spartans football coaches
Michigan State Spartans men's basketball coaches
People from Beaver Dam, Wisconsin
Players of American football from Wisconsin
1894 births
1980 deaths
Sportspeople from the Milwaukee metropolitan area